Paragalaxias eleotroides also known as the (Great Lake darter, and also the Great Lake galaxias) is a genus of freshwater fish of the family Galaxiidae, endemic to Tasmania, Australia.

The fish is only known to occur in the Central Highlands (Tasmania) and has been designated as vulnerable.

There are currently four recognized species in this genus:

It is one of the species considered in the 2006 ''Threatened Tasmanian Galaxiidae recovery programme.

See also 
 Arthurs paragalaxias
 Pedder galaxias

References

External links
 Fishes of Australia : Paragalaxias eleotroides
 

Paragalaxias
Fish described in 1978